Ololygon centralis is a species of frog in the family Hylidae.
It is endemic to Brazil.
Its natural habitats are subtropical or tropical dry forests, moist savanna, subtropical or tropical moist shrubland, rivers, and intermittent freshwater marshes.
It is threatened by habitat loss.

References
 

centralis
Endemic fauna of Brazil
Amphibians described in 1996
Taxonomy articles created by Polbot